Paige may refer to:

People and fictional characters
 Paige (name), a given name, middle name, or surname, including lists of people and fictional characters
 Paige (wrestler) (Saraya-Jade Bevis, born 1992), English professional wrestler and actress

Geography 
 Mount Paige, in the Phillips Mountains, Marie Byrd Land, Antarctica
 Paige, Texas, United States, an unincorporated community
 Paige, Virginia, United States, an unincorporated community

Other 
 Paige (band), a UK pop-rock band
 Paige automobile (1908–1927), an American luxury automobile company
 Paige Compositor, an invention to replace the human typesetter of a printing press with a mechanical arm
Paige v. Banks, an 1872 United States Supreme Court case